Hemistomia whiteleggei is a species of minute freshwater snails with an operculum, aquatic gastropod molluscs or micromolluscs in the family Hydrobiidae. This species is endemic to Australia.

References

External links

Hemistomia
Gastropods of Australia
Critically endangered fauna of Australia
Gastropods described in 1889
Taxonomy articles created by Polbot